Matthew Bruce Mantei [MAN-tie] (born July 7, 1973) is an American former Major League Baseball relief pitcher. In his career, Mantei played with the Florida Marlins, Arizona Diamondbacks and Boston Red Sox. He batted and threw right-handed.

Career
Mantei had four pitches. He had two fastballs, one of which regularly hit 95 MPH and occasionally hit 100, a sharp curve and an occasional slider. He was also known to throw a knuckleball earlier in his career. Two issues concerning his play were his control and his ability for his arm to stay healthy.

Between 1995 and 1996, Mantei had only pitched in 26 games for the Marlins. He missed the 1997 season due to injury and came back in 1998 to post an ERA of 2.96 in 42 games.

After starting the 1999 season with the Florida Marlins and saving 10 games, he was traded to Arizona Diamondbacks in exchange for Vladimir Núñez, Brad Penny and Abraham Núñez.

In , Mantei worked hard to regain his old form. He had 29 saves while posting a 2.62 ERA.

Mantei missed most of 2004 after a surgery to deal with bone spurs in his shoulder. In 12 games, he was 0-3 with an 11.81 ERA and four saves.  At the end of the season he was signed by the Red Sox. 2005 was yet another injury-plagued season for Mantei, as he only pitched 26.3 innings before being placed on the disabled list for the remainder of the year.

Mantei was invited to the Detroit Tigers spring training camp in 2006 to make a comeback try. After suffering more arm troubles early in the spring, he left camp and was out of baseball until 2008.

Mantei threw a bullpen session for the Detroit Tigers on January 11,  and signed a minor league contract with them.  However, after experiencing discomfort in his arm a few games into spring training, he was released and retired on March 4.

In a ten-year career with Florida, Arizona, and Boston, Mantei owned a 14-18 record with a 4.07 ERA and 93 saves in 322.7 innings. He also compiled a 1.98 strikeout-to-walk ratio (396-to-200) and a 1.39 WHIP.

Post MLB Career
On March 4, 2014, Mantei and his family appeared on the History Channel program Counting Cars, commissioning a custom-restored 1953 Chevy truck.

References

External links

1973 births
Living people
Florida Marlins players
Arizona Diamondbacks players
Boston Red Sox players
Baseball players from Florida
Major League Baseball pitchers
Arizona League Mariners players
Bellingham Mariners players
Appleton Foxes players
Portland Sea Dogs players
Charlotte Knights players
Brevard County Manatees players
Tucson Sidewinders players
El Paso Diablos players
Toledo Mud Hens players